The 1940 East Renfrewshire by-election was a parliamentary by-election held on 9 May 1940 for the British House of Commons constituency of East Renfrewshire in Scotland.

Previous MP 
The seat had become vacant when the constituency's Unionist Member of Parliament (MP), the Marquess of Clydesdale, succeeded to the peerage as Duke of Hamilton. He had been East Renfrewshire's MP since winning the seat at a by-election in 1930.

Candidates 
During the Second World War unopposed by-elections were common, since the major parties had agreed not to contest by-elections when vacancies arose in seats held by the other parties; contests occurred only when independent candidates or minor parties chose to stand.

The Unionist candidate in East Renfrewshire, Guy Lloyd, therefore did not face a Labour Party or Liberal candidate. However, the Independent Labour Party (ILP) did not support the electoral truce, and Annie Maxton (sister of ILP leader James Maxton) stood as an ILP candidate in the by-election.

Results 
On a much-reduced turnout, the result was a massive victory for Lloyd, who won 80.7% of the votes. He remained East Renfrewshire's MP until he stepped down at the 1959 election.

Votes

References

See also
 East Renfrewshire constituency
 East Renfrewshire
 1926 East Renfrewshire by-election
 1930 East Renfrewshire by-election
 List of United Kingdom by-elections (1931–1950)

1940 elections in the United Kingdom
1940 in Scotland
1940s elections in Scotland
By-elections to the Parliament of the United Kingdom in Scottish constituencies
History of East Renfrewshire
Politics of Renfrewshire
Politics of East Renfrewshire
May 1940 events